Robinson is an unincorporated community in Morse Township, Saint Louis County, Minnesota, United States.

Geography
The community is located between Tower and Ely on State Highways 1 (MN 1) and 169 (MN 169). The boundary line between Eagles Nest Township and Morse Township is nearby. Bear Head Lake State Park is also in the vicinity.

History
The community bears the name of an early lumberman who worked in the area.

References

 Official State of Minnesota Highway Map – 2011/2012 edition

Unincorporated communities in Minnesota
Unincorporated communities in St. Louis County, Minnesota